Jakov Blažević (24 March 1912 – 10 December 1996) was a Croatian politician who served as president of the Executive Council of the People's Republic of Croatia, a constituent Republic of the Federal People's Republic of Yugoslavia, from 18 December 1953 to 10 July 1962.

See also
Prime Minister of Croatia

References 

1912 births
1996 deaths
People from Gospić
Croatian politicians
Croatian communists
Yugoslav communists
Recipients of the Order of the People's Hero
Burials at Mirogoj Cemetery